Genoplesium eriochilum, commonly known as the Mount Wilson midge orchid, is a species of small terrestrial orchid endemic to the Blue Mountains. It has a single thin leaf fused to the flowering stem and up to twenty small, crowded, dark purplish brown flowers. It usually grows between low shrubs and sedges.

Description
As with others in the genus, the flowers are inverted so that the labellum is above the column rather than below it. The sepals, petals and labellum all have tiny hairs on their edges. There is a callus in the centre of the labellum and extending nearly to its tip. Flowering occurs from November to January.

Taxonomy and naming
The Mount Wilson midge orchid was first formally described in 1885 by Robert D. FitzGerald who gave it the name Prasophyllum  eriochilum and published the description in Journal of Botany, British and Foreign. In 1989, David Jones and Mark Clements changed the name to Genoplesium eriochilum and in 2002, changed it again to Corunastylis eriochila but the last change is not accepted by the Australian Plant Census. The specific epithet (eriochilum) is derived from the Ancient Greek words ἔριον (erion) meaning "wool" and χεῖλος (cheilos) meaning lip.

Distribution and habitat
Genoplesium eriochilum is only known from the Blue Mountains between Blackheath, Mount Wilson and Mount Victoria, where it grows in heath with grasses and sedges.

References

eriochilum
Endemic orchids of Australia
Orchids of New South Wales
Plants described in 1885